Emin County, the official romanized name, also transliterated from Mongolian as Dörbiljin County, is a county situated in the north of the Xinjiang Uyghur Autonomous Region and is under the administration of the Tacheng Prefecture, bordering Kazakhstan's districts of Tarbagatay and Zaysan.
The Postcode is 834600.

Geographically, the county is located on the southern slopes of the Tarbagatai Mountains and in the Emin Valley. The main watercourse is the Emin (Emil) River.

Name
The place was originally named Dörbiljin. In 1918, Yang Zengxin, the governor of Xinjiang, petitioned to have a county set up in the Emin Valley. The new county was named after the Emin (Emil) River.

Transportation
The Karamay–Tacheng Railway (under  construction as of  2017) will serve Emin County.

Administrative divisions 
Town (镇)
Emin Town (额敏镇)
	
Townships (乡)
Jiaoqu Township (郊区乡) | Shanghu Township (上户乡) | Yushikalasu Township (玉什喀拉苏乡) | Jieleagashi Township (杰勒阿尕什乡) | Marelesu Township (玛热勒苏乡) | Kagalayemule Township (喀拉也木勒乡) | Lamazhao Township (喇嘛昭乡) | Erdaoqiao Township (二道桥乡)

Ethnic Townships (民族乡)
Emaleguoleng Mongol Township (额玛勒郭楞蒙古族乡) |  Huojierte Mongol Township (霍吉尔特蒙古族乡)

Others
Erzhihe Ranch (二支河牧场) | Jiaerbulake Farm (加尔布拉克农场) | Kuoshibike Pedigree Ranch (阔什比克良种场) | Saeryemule Ranch (萨尔也木勒牧场) | Yemule Ranch (也木勒牧场) | Tachengyequ Pedigree Sheep Farm (塔城地区种羊场) | Wuzongbulake Ranch (吾宗布拉克牧场) | Shuifeng army regiment farm (水丰兵团团结农场) | Nongjiushi 农九师（红星岗兵团169团 | 锡伯提兵团166团 | 麦海因兵团167团 | 乌什水兵团168团 | 达因苏兵团165团）

Climate

References

County-level divisions of Xinjiang
Tacheng Prefecture